Gero Kretschmer and Alexander Satschko were the defending champions but chose not to defend their title.

Roman Jebavý and Andrej Martin won the title after defeating Nils Langer and Gerald Melzer 3–6, 6–1, [10–5] in the final.

Seeds

Draw

References
 Main Draw

Città di Como Challenger - Doubles
Città di Como Challenger